is a type of Japanese pottery traditionally from Kagoshima Prefecture.

It was started by Korean potters about four hundred years ago.

References

External links

Culture in Kagoshima Prefecture
Japanese pottery